Events from the year 1751 in art.

Events
 September 13 – The Kalvária Banská Štiavnica in the Kingdom of Hungary is completed
 Edme-François Gersaint's Catalogue raisonné de toutes les piėces qui forment l'oeuvre de Rembrandt, the first catalogue raisonné of a single artist's graphic work, is published posthumously in Paris
 Charles-Joseph Natoire is appointed director of the French Academy in Rome
 Giovanni Paolo Pannini restarts work on the Trevi Fountain after the death of Nicola Salvi

Works

 François Boucher – Toilette of Venus
 Canaletto – London: The Thames from Somerset House Terrace towards the City and London: The Thames from Somerset House Terrace towards Westminster (pair, c. 1750–51)
 Maurice Quentin de La Tour – Self-portrait (pastels)
 William Hogarth engraves the prints Gin Lane, Beer Street and The Four Stages of Cruelty
 Pietro Longhi – The Rhinoceros
 Andrea Soldi – Louis-François Roubiliac
 Charles-André Vanloo paints portraits

Births
 January 7 – François Dumont, French painter of portrait miniatures (died 1831)
 January 31 – Jean François Carteaux, French painter and army commander (died 1813)
 February 18 – Adolf Ulrik Wertmüller, Swedish painter (died 1811)
 April 1 – Joseph Lange, Austrian actor and amateur painter (died  1831)
 May 11 – Ralph Earl, American Loyalist painter (died 1801)
 May 25 (bapt.) – John Raphael Smith, English painter and mezzotint engraver (died 1812)
 June 5 – Georg Haas, Danish engraver (died 1817)
 July 4
 Giuseppe Ceracchi, Italian-born portrait sculpture and republican (guillotined 1801)
 Heneage Finch, 4th Earl of Aylesford, British peer, politician and artist (died 1812)
 August 2 – Nicolas-Marie Gatteaux, French medal engraver (died 1832)
 September 13 – Hendrik Kobell, Dutch landscape and marine painter, etcher, draftsman and watercolorist (died 1799)
 October 6 – John Webber, English landscape artist (died 1793)
 December 8 – Heinrich Füger, German portrait and historical painter (died 1818)
 December 20 – Daniël Dupré, Dutch engraver, painter, draftsman, and watercolorist (died 1817)
 December 31 – Johann Baptist von Lampi the Elder, Austrian historical and portrait painter (died 1830)
 date unknown
 George Brookshaw, English painter and illustrator (died 1823)
 William Hamilton, English painter (died 1801)
 Anna Maria Mengs, German portrait painter in pastel and miniature (died 1792)
 Thomas Sheraton, English furniture designer (died 1806)
 John Keyse Sherwin, English engraver and painter (died 1790)
 Henry Tresham, Irish-born painter of large-scale history paintings (died 1814)

Deaths
 January 6 - Carl Marcus Tuscher, German-born Danish polymath, portrait painter, printmaker, architect, and decorator (born 1705)
 January 29 – Jacob van Schuppen, Austrian painter (born 1670)
 March 8 – Jan František Händl, Czech Roman Catholic priest and baroque painter (born 1691)
 August 1 – Helena Arnell, one of the first Finnish painters and few female artists (born 1697)
 September 21 – Annibale Albani, Italian Cardinal and art collector (born 1682)
 date unknown
 Francesco Andreini, Italian painter (born 1697)
 Jean Charles Flipart, French engraver (born 1682)
 Giovanni Domenico Lombardi, Italian painter in Lucca (born 1682)
 Michele Rocca, Italian painter who practised in Rome (born 1671)

References

 
Years of the 18th century in art
1750s in art